Día tras día may refer to:

 Día tras día, the fifth studio album by Andrés Cepeda
 Día tras día, the 1951 Spanish film directed by Antonio del Amo